James, Jim or Jimmy Jordan may refer to:

Sports
 James Jordan (cricketer) (1793–1866), English first-class cricketer
 Jimmy Jordan (baseball) (1908–1957), American Major League Baseball player
 Jim Jordan (basketball) (1925–1999), American guard
 James Jordan (American football) (born 1978), American football player

Arts
Jim Jordan (actor) (1896–1988), American radio comedy performer
James Jordan (conductor) (born 1953), American musician, writer and educator
James Jordan (dancer) (born 1978), English professional ballroom dancer
James Jordan (actor) (born 1979), American television performer
Jim Jordan (photographer), American fashion and commercial photographer

Politics
 James Jordan (Indiana judge) (1842–1912), Indiana Supreme Court Justice
 Jim Jordan (Canadian politician) (1928–2012), Canadian Member of Parliament
 Jim Jordan (political consultant) (born 1961), American Democratic strategist
 Jim Jordan (American politician) (born 1964),  U.S. representative for Ohio's 4th congressional district since 2007

Others
James Jordan (publicist) (1930–2004), American publicist and advertising copywriter
James R. Jordan Sr. (1936–1993), American murder victim and father of basketball star Michael Jordan
James B. Jordan (born 1949), American Calvinist theologian and author

See also
Jordan James (disambiguation)
James Jorden